Claresholm Industrial Airport (formerly known as RCAF Station Claresholm)  is located  south southwest of Claresholm, Alberta, Canada.

The airport opened in 1941 as RCAF Station Claresholm as part of the British Commonwealth Air Training Plan and closed in 1945. In 1951 it was reopened as a NATO training centre and closed again in 1958 when the centre was moved. The airport was later reopened as Claresholm Industrial Airport.

Claresholm's single operating runway is one of the RCAF station's three runways. Claresholm was built in the typical triangular pattern of three runways in order to accommodate a wide range of wind directions. The other two original runways are now abandoned but in current aerial photography these runways and accompanying taxiways appear to be in at least fair condition unlike those at the nearby Fort Macleod Airport.

References

External links
Page about this airport on COPA's Places to Fly airport directory

Registered aerodromes in Alberta
Canadian Forces bases in Canada (closed)
Claresholm
Municipal District of Willow Creek No. 26